José Carlos Millás (January 22, 1889 – November 28, 1965) was a Cuban meteorologist. He is known for his research on past Atlantic hurricane seasons, and has been called one of the "fathers of tropical meteorology".

Born in Havana, Cuba, Millás graduated as a civil engineer from the University of Havana. He then took post-graduate courses at the University of Chicago. In 1913 he was appointed assistant director of the National Observatory of Cuba, becoming the institute's director in 1921. In the 1930s, before radar and refined hurricane-tracking equipment was available, Millás collaborated with R. W. Gray and Grady Norton of the Weather Bureau to plot the course of tropical cyclones.

Millás remained in that position at the National Observatory until 1961, when the Cuban Revolution forced him to emigrate to the United States. He became an assistant professor at the University of Miami and conducted research for the Weather Bureau until his death in 1965.

Millás was decorated with the National Order of Merit of Cub] and the Order of the Aztec Eagle.

Selected publications

References

Further reading

1889 births
1965 deaths
Cuban scientists
University of Chicago alumni
University of Miami faculty